Gelting is a municipality in the district of Schleswig-Flensburg, in Schleswig-Holstein, Germany. It is situated near the Baltic Sea, approx. 33 km northeast of Schleswig, and 30 km east of Flensburg.

Gelting is part of the Amt ("collective municipality") Geltinger Bucht.

Shield or Coat of Arms 

Heraldic Description:: „The coat of arms is blue under a radiant golden half sun a golden plow with a silver ploughshare.“

Gelting Personalities 
 Detlev von Ahlefeldt (1612–1686), Military officer, War Commissioner for the Danish King
 Seneca Freiherr von Gelting (1715-1786), regional landowner 
 Hermann Bendix Todsen (1864–1946), Mayor of Flensburg
 Herbert Kortum (1907–1979), Scientist; computer scientist and DDR computer pioneer
 Vera Dietz Motika(1936-2020 ) singer and performer; emigrated to Columbus, Ohio, USA. By the act of emigration, she gave up all chance to obtain a European title.

External links 

 Collection of images of the area
  
 Material of the Gelting regions in der in the collections at the regional library in Berlin (PDF; 275 kB)

References

Schleswig-Flensburg